Hans Mayer (1907–2001), German Jewish literary critic.

Hans Mayer may also refer to:

 Hans Ferdinand Mayer (1895–1980), German electrical engineer and author of the Oslo Report
 Hans E. Mayer, 20th-century historian of medieval topics

See also
Hans Meyer (disambiguation)
 Hannes Meyer (1889–1954), Swiss Bauhaus architect
 Hans Meier (1918–2007), German officer, recipient of the Knights Cross
 Jean Améry (Hanns Chaim Mayer, 1912–1978), Auschwitz survivor and Holocaust writer